Most Daring is an American reality television series produced by Nash Entertainment and truTV Original Productions, originally airing on truTV for 7 seasons from September 2007 to July 2010.

Synopsis
Initially showing only rescue footage, it later became a companion to the show Most Shocking and like its sister show, it features footage of police chases, daring rescues, vehicular accidents, catastrophic failures, abnormal talents, and other crazy and outrageous content which sometimes could be scary for some viewers. It bills itself as "The Footage too shocking for Most Shocking."

Episodes

International broadcasts

(All of above times are local times of each country)

Syndication
The show had many reruns on Chiller from 2016 to 2017. Repeats of the series are currently airing on the digital broadcast network Quest. 
On December 9, 2020, A&E announced that they will air reruns of the show, the series aired from December 19, 2020, to March 31, 2021, and the reruns return from May 2 to May 23, 2022.

External links 

truTV's "Most Daring" Site, with Video Clips

2000s American reality television series
2010s American reality television series
2007 American television series debuts
2010 American television series endings
TruTV original programming